The 1996 3 Nations Cup rosters consisted of 73 players from three women's national ice hockey teams.

Canada
On October 18, 1996, Hockey Canada named its final 27-woman roster for the tournament. Laura Leslie and Marianne Grnak, two members of the gold medal winning Canadian team at the 1994 IIHF Women's World Championship, were among the final cuts. Forwards Danielle Goyette and Stacy Wilson remained on the roster despite being injured with separated shoulders throughout the tournament. Canada was led by two coaches at the tournament—head coach Shannon Miller and assistant coach Danièle Sauvageau. A third coach, Melody Davidson, was with the team during the evaluation camp but was not named to the final tournament coaching staff.

 Head coach:

Skaters

Goaltenders

Finland
Finland entered the tournament with a 24-woman roster. Finland was led by two coaches at the tournament—head coach Rauno Korpi and assistant coach Jorma Kurjenmäki.

 Head coach:

Skaters

Goaltenders

United States
The United States entered the tournament with a 22-woman roster. The United States was led by three coaches at the tournament—head coach Ben Smith and assistant coaches Tom Mutch and Digit Murphy. Forward Cammi Granato led the United States with five goals and six points at the tournament, 

 Head coach:

Skaters

Goaltenders

References

4 Nations Cup rosters